The meridian 104° west of Greenwich is a line of longitude that extends from the North Pole across the Arctic Ocean, North America, the Pacific Ocean, the Southern Ocean, and Antarctica to the South Pole.

The 104th meridian west forms a great circle with the 76th meridian east.

In the United States, the western boundaries of North Dakota, South Dakota, and Nebraska and the eastern boundaries of Montana and Wyoming lie on the meridian 27° west of Washington, which is a couple of miles west of the meridian 104° west of Greenwich.  In Colorado, the meridian 104° west of Greenwich roughly defines the eastern extent of the region of high plains protected by the Southern Rocky Mountains.

From Pole to Pole
Starting at the North Pole and heading south to the South Pole, the 104th meridian west passes through:

{| class="wikitable plainrowheaders"
! scope="col" width="130" | Co-ordinates
! scope="col" | Country, territory or sea
! scope="col" | Notes
|-
| style="background:#b0e0e6;" | 
! scope="row" style="background:#b0e0e6;" | Arctic Ocean
| style="background:#b0e0e6;" |
|-
| 
! scope="row" | 
| Nunavut — Ellef Ringnes Island
|-
| style="background:#b0e0e6;" | 
! scope="row" style="background:#b0e0e6;" | Maclean Strait
| style="background:#b0e0e6;" |
|-
| 
! scope="row" | 
| Nunavut — Edmund Walker Island
|-
| style="background:#b0e0e6;" | 
! scope="row" style="background:#b0e0e6;" | Desbarats Strait
| style="background:#b0e0e6;" |
|-
| 
! scope="row" | 
| Nunavut — Cameron Island and Île Vanier
|-valign="top"
| style="background:#b0e0e6;" | 
! scope="row" style="background:#b0e0e6;" | Byam Martin Channel
| style="background:#b0e0e6;" | Passing just west of Massey Island, Nunavut,  (at ) Passing just west of Île Marc, Nunavut,  (at )
|-
| style="background:#b0e0e6;" | 
! scope="row" style="background:#b0e0e6;" | Austin Channel
| style="background:#b0e0e6;" |
|-
| 
! scope="row" | 
| Nunavut — Byam Martin Island
|-
| style="background:#b0e0e6;" | 
! scope="row" style="background:#b0e0e6;" | Parry Channel
| style="background:#b0e0e6;" | Viscount Melville Sound
|-
| style="background:#b0e0e6;" | 
! scope="row" style="background:#b0e0e6;" | M'Clintock Channel
| style="background:#b0e0e6;" |
|-
| 
! scope="row" | 
| Nunavut — Victoria Island
|-
| style="background:#b0e0e6;" | 
! scope="row" style="background:#b0e0e6;" | Queen Maud Gulf
| style="background:#b0e0e6;" |
|-valign="top"
| 
! scope="row" | 
| Nunavut Northwest Territories — from  Saskatchewan — from 
|-valign="top"
| 
! scope="row" | 
| North Dakota South Dakota — from  Nebraska — from  Colorado — from  New Mexico — from  Texas — from 
|-valign="top"
| 
! scope="row" | 
| Chihuahua Durango — from  Zacatecas — from  Jalisco — from  Nayarit — from  Jalisco — from  Colima — from 
|-
| style="background:#b0e0e6;" | 
! scope="row" style="background:#b0e0e6;" | Pacific Ocean
| style="background:#b0e0e6;" |
|-
| style="background:#b0e0e6;" | 
! scope="row" style="background:#b0e0e6;" | Southern Ocean
| style="background:#b0e0e6;" |
|-
| 
! scope="row" | Antarctica
| Unclaimed territory
|-
|}

See also
103rd meridian west
105th meridian west

w104 meridian west